David Hartley is a British figure skater. He is a three-time (2002, 2005, 2006) British bronze medalist. He works as a coach in Sheffield, was the British Ice Teachers Association's young coach of the year for 2009, works for British Ice Skating, and has produced numerous Christmas shows for the city.

Competitive highlights

References

 Tracings.net profile

British male single skaters
Living people
Year of birth missing (living people)